Oak Mills is an unincorporated community in Atchison County, Kansas, United States.

History
Oak Mills was located on the Missouri Pacific Railroad.

A post office was opened in Plum Grove (an extinct community) in 1862, but it was moved to Oak Mills in 1868 and remained in operation until it was discontinued in 1945.

References

Further reading

External links
 Atchison County maps: Current, Historic, KDOT

Unincorporated communities in Atchison County, Kansas
Unincorporated communities in Kansas
1868 establishments in Kansas
Populated places established in 1868